"La La Land" is a song by American rapper and singer Bryce Vine featuring American rapper YG, released through Sire Records on February 28, 2019, as the second single from Vine's debut album Carnival. It debuted at number 92 on the US Billboard Hot 100 in June 2019.

Charts

Certifications

References

2019 singles
2019 songs
Bryce Vine songs
YG (rapper) songs
Songs about Los Angeles
Songs written by Sir Nolan
Songs written by YG (rapper)